Anna Margrethe "Molla" Bjurstedt Mallory (née Bjurstedt; 6 March 1884 – 22 November 1959) was a Norwegian-American tennis player. She won a record eight singles titles at the U.S. National Championships. She was the first woman to represent Norway at the Olympics.

Tennis career
Although she had won a bronze medal in singles for Norway at the 1912 Summer Olympics in Stockholm, and was the many-time champion of her homeland, Mallory was relatively unknown when she arrived in New York City to begin work as a masseuse in 1915. She entered the U.S. Indoor Championships that year unheralded and beat Marie Wagner 6–4, 6–4, which was the first of her five singles titles at that tournament. She also won the singles title in Cincinnati in 1915.

Mallory had less in the way of stroke equipment than most tennis champions, but she was a fierce competitor, running with great endurance. Robert Kelleher, a former president of the United States Tennis Association (USTA) and a ball boy during Mallory's era, once said "She looked and acted tough when she was on the court hitting tennis balls. She walked around in a manner that said you'd better look out or she'd deck you. She was an indomitable scrambler and runner. She was a fighter."

She held that a woman could not sustain a volleying attack in a long match. "I do not know a single girl who can play the net game." Therefore, she relied on her baseline game, consisting of strong forehand attacks and a ceaseless defense that wore down her opponents. She took the ball on the rise and drove it from corner to corner to keep her opponent on the constant run. Her quick returns made her passing shots extremely effective. She once said "I find that the girls generally do not hit the ball as hard as they should. I believe in always hitting the ball with all my might, but there seems to be a disposition to 'just get it over' in many girls whom I have played. I do not call this tennis."

Her second-round match with Suzanne Lenglen at the 1921 U.S. National Championships brought Mallory her greatest celebrity. Before the match, Bill Tilden advised Mallory to "hit the cover off the ball." Once the match began, Mallory "attacked with a vengeance" and was ahead 2–0 (40–0) when Lenglen began to cough. Mallory won the first set 6–2 and was up 40–0 on Lenglen's serve in the first game of the second set when Lenglen began to weep and walked to the umpire's stand and informed the official that she was ill and could not continue. After the match, the USTA accused Lenglen of feigning illness. The French Tennis Federation (FTF) exonerated Lenglen and accepted her testimony (and a doctor's) that she had been ill. However, Albert de Joannis, vice president of the FTF who accompanied Lenglen during her trip to the United States, quit his post in protest of the FTF's conclusion. He claimed that Lenglen was "perfectly fit" during the match and that, "She was defeated by a player who on that date showed a better brand of tennis."

Lenglen avenged the loss by defeating Mallory 6–2, 6–0 in 26 minutes in the 1922 Wimbledon final, the shortest final in a Grand Slam tournament on record. Lenglen reportedly said to Mallory after the match, "Now, Mrs. Mallory, I have proved to you today what I could have done to you in New York last year," to which Mallory replied, "Mlle. Lenglen, you have done to me today what I did to you in New York last year; you have beaten me." However, Kathleen McKane Godfree has said that Lenglen denied this exchange. Lenglen claimed that she merely said "thank you" to Mallory and coughed suggestively behind her hand. This was to remind Mallory that she – Lenglen – had indeed had whooping cough in their New York match the previous year. The two played for the last time that summer in Nice, France, with Lenglen winning 6–0, 6–0. This completed the head-to-head rivalry between the players, with Lenglen winning their first match at the 1921 World Hard Court Championships 6–3, 6–2, after which Mallory said about Lenglen, "She is just the steadiest player that ever was. She just sent back at me whatever I sent at her and waited for me to make a fault. And her returns often enough were harder than the shots I sent up to her."

Mallory won the singles title at the U.S. Championships a record eight times in 15 attempts, with the last of her titles occurring at age 42 in 1926. Her worst finish there was a quarterfinal loss in 1927 at age 43. In 1926, Mallory hit one of the heights of her career when she came back from 0–4 in the third set of the final against Elizabeth Ryan, saving a match point in winning her eighth championship. Her farewell to the U.S. Championships was as a 45-year-old semifinalist in 1929, losing to Helen Wills Moody 6–0, 6–0. Mallory is the only woman other than Chris Evert to have won the U.S. Championships four consecutive times. 

Molla also multiple titles at other tournaments such as the Middle States Championships which she won record seven times (1915, 1921–22, 1924–25, 1927–28). She also won the Seabright Invitational Tournament three times (1921–23).

She died on 22 November 1959, aged 75, in Stockholm, Sweden.

Legacy
According to A. Wallis Myers of The Daily Telegraph and the Daily Mail, Mallory was ranked in the world top 10 from 1921 (when the rankings for women began) through 1927, reaching a career high of World No. 2 in those rankings in 1921 and 1922. She was ranked in the U.S. top 10 for 13 consecutive years from 1915 through 1928 (no rankings were issued in 1917) and was top ranked from 1915 through 1922 and in 1926.

Mallory was inducted into the International Tennis Hall of Fame in 1958.

In 1916, she co-wrote the book Tennis for Women with Samuel Crowther.

Grand Slam finals

Singles: 11 (8 titles, 3 runners-up)

Doubles: 4 (2 titles, 2 runners-up)

Mixed doubles: 8 (3 titles, 5 runners-up)

Grand Slam singles tournament timeline

R = tournament restricted to French nationals.

1Through 1923, the French Championships were open only to French nationals. The World Hard Court Championships (WHCC), actually played on clay in Paris or Brussels, began in 1912 and were open to all nationalities. The results from that tournament are shown here from 1912 through 1914 and from 1920 through 1923. The Olympics replaced the WHCC in 1924, as the Olympics were held in Paris. Beginning in 1925, the French Championships were open to all nationalities, with the results shown here beginning with that year.

Personal life
She was the daughter of Major Axel Johan Bjurstedt (born 1848) and Anna Benedicte Jenssen (born 1854); Anna Benedicte was the daughter of landowner Benedict Jenssen.

On 3 September 1919, she married stock broker Franklin Mallory in New York City.

See also 
 Performance timelines for all female tennis players who reached at least one Grand Slam final

References

External links 

 
 
 
 

1884 births
1959 deaths
Sportspeople from Oslo
American female tennis players
Norwegian emigrants to the United States
Norwegian female tennis players
Olympic bronze medalists for Norway
Olympic tennis players of Norway
International Tennis Hall of Fame inductees
Tennis players at the 1912 Summer Olympics
Tennis players at the 1924 Summer Olympics
United States National champions (tennis)
Olympic medalists in tennis
Grand Slam (tennis) champions in women's singles
Grand Slam (tennis) champions in women's doubles
Grand Slam (tennis) champions in mixed doubles
Medalists at the 1912 Summer Olympics
People with acquired American citizenship
US Open (tennis) champions